The Italy national handball team is the national handball team of Italy. It only had 1 appearance in World championship 1997, and the next year hosted the European Championship (in both times coached by Lino Červar). It had poor result in both competitions. It never qualified for the Olympic Games.

Competitive record

World Championship

European Championship

Mediterranean Games
1979 – 2nd
1991 – 3rd
1997 – 2nd
2013 – 4th

Team

Current squad
The Italian international squad at the 2023 World Championship Qualification

Former head coaches
 Lino Červar
 Francisco Javier Equisoain Azanza “Zupo“

Notable players
 Settimio Massotti (1360 goals in 302 international caps)
 Alessandro Tarafino (14 times Italian Serie A Champion)
 Zaim Kobilica
 Franco Chionchio
 Alessandro Fusina
 Ivan Mestriner
 Marcello “Air” Montalto
 Tin Tokic

See also
Italy women's national handball team

References

External links

IHF profile

Handball
Men's national handball teams